Scarred for Life may refer to:

 Scarred for Life (Rose Tattoo album)
 Scarred for Life (Ignite album)